Barry A. Love M.D. is a cardiologist specializing in pediatric and congenital heart problems.

Love is currently director of the Congenital Cardiac Catheterization Laboratory  at the Mount Sinai Medical Center and assistant professor of both pediatrics and cardiology at the Mount Sinai School of Medicine, both in New York City. He specializes in pediatric interventional catheterization, electrophysiology and arrhythmia and syncope.

Love is the author of 3 book chapters and 20 peer-reviewed publications and was listed in Castle Connolly's Top Doctors from 2009 to 2011 and among New York's Super Doctors from 2008 to 2011. He lectures and teaches nationally and internationally about cardiac interventions.

Biography
Love studied immunology and microbiology at the University of Toronto and graduated medical school cum laude at the University of Western Ontario in 1993. He completed a residency in pediatrics at the Montreal Children's Hospital, McGill University in 1996, and a fellowship at Children's Hospital Boston (Harvard University) in 2000.

Love served as assistant professor of pediatrics in the Division of Cardiology at Montreal Children's Hospital from 2000 to 2002. In 2003, he joined the Mount Sinai Medical Center as assistant professor of both pediatrics and cardiology and director of the Congenital Cardiac Catheterization Laboratory. He carries additional hospital appointment at  Hackensack University Medical Center, both in New Jersey.

Honors and appointments
 Castle Connolly Top Doctors, 2009–2011
 New York Super Doctors, 2008–2011
 Mount Sinai Independent Practice Association Board Member 2008–present
 PULSE Newsletter editorial board, 2007–present
 Cardiac Catheterization Laboratory Executive Committee, 2004–present

Clinical research

Book chapters
Love BA. Aortopulmonary Septal Defect in eMedicine Pediatrics 2001. Revised 2009.
Love BA. Patent Foramen Ovale in eMedicine Pediatrics 2001. Revised 2009.
Love BA. Congenital Heart Disease in Comprehensive Pediatric Hospital Medicine. Zaoutis LB, Chiang VW. 2007.

Publications
Partial list:

References

External links
Mount Sinai Medical Center homepage
The Mount Sinai School of Medicine homepage
Mount Sinai Heart

Canadian pediatric cardiologists
Living people
Icahn School of Medicine at Mount Sinai faculty
University of Toronto alumni
University of Western Ontario alumni
American pediatric cardiologists
Year of birth missing (living people)